Honjogawa Dam  is a gravity dam located in Hyogo Prefecture in Japan. The dam is used for flood control, irrigation and water supply. The catchment area of the dam is 3.4 km2. The dam impounds about 12  ha of land when full and can store 1720 thousand cubic meters of water. The construction of the dam was started on 1985 and completed in 2004.

See also
List of dams in Japan

References

Dams in Hyogo Prefecture